The Journal of Interprofessional Care is a bimonthly peer-reviewed medical journal that covers education, practice, and research in health and social care.

Aims and scope 
The Journal of Interprofessional Care aims to disseminate research and new developments in the field of interprofessional education and practice. We welcome contributions containing an explicit interprofessional focus, and involving a range of settings, professions, and fields. Areas of practice covered include primary, community and hospital care, health education and public health, and beyond health and social care into fields such as criminal justice and primary/elementary education. Papers introducing additional interprofessional views, for example, from a community development or environmental design perspective, are welcome.

The Journal publishes the following types of manuscripts:

1. Peer-reviewed Original Articles (research studies, systematic/analytical reviews, theoretical papers) that focus on interprofessional education and/or practice, and add to the conceptual, empirical or theoretical knowledge of the interprofessional field.

2. Peer-reviewed Short Reports that describe research plans, studies in progress or recently completed, or an interprofessional innovation.

3. Peer-reviewed Interprofessional Education and Practice (IPEP) Guides that offer practical advice on successfully undertaking various interprofessional activities.

4. Guest Editorials that discuss a salient issue related to interprofessional education and practice.

5. Book and Report Reviews that offer summaries of recently published books and reports (published on the Journal's Blog).

The Journal was established in 1986 and is published by Taylor & Francis. The editor-in-chief is Dr Andreas Xyrichis (King's College London). The Journal of Interprofessional Care is supported by an international editorial board.

Publication History

Currently known as 
 Journal of Interprofessional Care (1992 - current)

Formerly known as 
 Holistic Medicine (1986 - 1991)

Subjects Covered by this Journal 
Allied Health; Community Health; Community Social Work; Health Education and Promotion; Health and Social Care; Public Health Policy and Practice; Social Work and Social Policy

Abstracting & Indexing  
The journal is abstracted and indexed in:

2016 Journal Citation Reports® Ranks Journal of Interprofessional Care 22nd out of 77 journals in Health Care Sciences & Services (S) and 36th out of 74 journals in the Health Policy & Services (Ss) with a 2016 Impact Factor of 2.205

See also 
 Health human resources
 Interprofessional education in health care

References

External links 
Taylor & Francis Website: Official Journal Website

Blog: JIC Blog
Healthcare journals
Publications established in 1986
Bimonthly journals
Taylor & Francis academic journals
English-language journals